Alambre is a Mexican dish consisting of grilled beef topped with bell peppers, onions, cheese, salsa and, in some variations, avocado. It is usually served with freshly made corn or flour tortillas. The most common ingredient is beef, and other kinds of meat such as chicken or pork are also used. Some recipes even substitute chopped ham or chorizo instead of the bacon. Alambres are popular in many parts of Mexico and among Mexican-American populations across the United States.

Etymology

The word  literally means "wire" in Spanish. It is commonly believed that the name refers to the act of skewering the ingredients while cooking, although this is not always what is done.

See also
 List of Mexican dishes

References

Mexican cuisine
Mexican beef dishes
Tortilla-based dishes